Eastwood Guitars is a Canadian manufacturer of guitars. The company specializes in making vintage-style instruments including electric guitars, basses, acoustic guitars, electric mandolins, resonator guitars, lap steels, tenor guitars, and ukuleles.

Notable players 
Notable musicians that have played Eastwood guitars:

Adrian Belew (Airline Coronado, Spectrum 5 Pro)
Peter Buck (Nashville 12)
Ryan Delahoussaye (Warren Ellis Mandocello)
Warren Ellis (Warren Ellis Tenor)
Alex Henry Foster (Warren Ellis Tenor) 
PJ Harvey (Airline 3P, Warren Ellis Tenor) 
Jack Johnson (Airline 59 Coronado) 
Peter Kember (Airline 59 2P) 
Richard Lloyd (Sidejack DLX, Classic 6 Richard Lloyd Signature)
Bill Nelson (Astroluxe Cadet, Saturn 63, Airline Twin Tone, Airline Town & Country, Airline MAP DLX, etc.)
Colin Newman (Airline Map)
Lee Ranaldo (Warren Ellis Tenor)
Todd Rundgren (Blacklund Model 100)
Corey Taylor (Rivolta Mondata VIII)
Nick Valensi (Rivolta Combinata)
Jeff Wootton (Airline 3P DLX, Airline Town & Country, Airline Jetson Jr.)
Susumu Hirasawa (Backlund Model 400)

References

External links
 Official website

Companies based in Brampton
Canadian companies established in 2001
Guitar manufacturing companies
Musical instrument manufacturing companies of Canada